The 2021–22 VMI Keydets basketball team represents the Virginia Military Institute in the 2021–22 NCAA Division I men's basketball season. The Keydets, led by seventh-year head coach Dan Earl, play their home games in Cameron Hall in Lexington, Virginia as members of the Southern Conference. They finished the regular season 16–15, 9–9 in SoCon play to finish in a tie for fifth place. As the No. 5 seed in the SoCon tournament, they lost to Wofford in the quarterfinals. They accepted an invitation to play in the College Basketball Invitational tournament marking their first postseason tournament appearance since 2014. As a No. 8 seed, they lost to No. 9-seeded UNC Wilmington in the first round.

Previous season
In a season limited due to the ongoing COVID-19 pandemic, the Keydets finished the 2020–21 season 13–12, 7–7 in SoCon play to finish in sixth place. They upset Furman in overtime in the quarterfinals of the SoCon tournament, before falling to Mercer in the semifinals.

Roster

Schedule and results

|-
!colspan=12 style=| Non-conference regular season

|-
!colspan=12 style=| SoCon regular season

|-
!colspan=9 style=| SoCon tournament

|-
!colspan=9 style=| CBI

Sources

References

VMI Keydets basketball seasons
Vmi
Vmi
VMI Keydets basketball
VMI Keydets basketball